Livojärvi is a medium-sized lake in the Iijoki main catchment area. It is located in Posio municipality, in the Lapland region in Finland. Quality of water is good.

See also
List of lakes in Finland
 Posiolapland.com - Posio Tourism

References

Lakes of Posio